The 1992–93 season of the European Cup Winners' Cup was won by Parma in the final against Royal Antwerp. Both were first time finalists in the competition, and Antwerp were the last Belgian side to reach a European final up to the present day. The competition had more entrants than ever before due to the break-up of Yugoslavia and the Soviet Union, resulting in many new countries eligible to enter the winners of their own cups into the competition. Israel, the Faroe Islands and Liechtenstein were also represented for the first time.

Qualifying round

|}

First leg

Second leg

Chornomorets Odesa won 12–1 on aggregate.

Maribor won 5–2 on aggregate.

Avenir Beggen won 2–1 on aggregate.

Hapoel Petah Tikva won 4–0 on aggregate.

First round

|}

First leg

Second leg

Steaua București won 4–0 on aggregate.

Liverpool won 8–2 on aggregate.

4–4 on aggregate. AGF won on away goals.

Admira Wacker won 3–1 on aggregate.

2–2 on aggregate. Feyenoord won on away goals.

Sparta Prague won 3–1 on aggregate.

Olympiacos won 3–1 on aggregate.

Trabzonspor won 4–2 on aggregate.

Monaco won 1–0 on aggregate.

2–2 on aggregate. Luzern won on away goals.

Spartak Moscow won 5–1 on aggregate.

Werder Bremen won 4–3 on aggregate.

2–2 on aggregate. Royal Antwerp won 3–1 on penalties.

Atlético Madrid won 9–1 on aggregate.

Parma won 2–1 on aggregate.

Boavista won 3–0 on aggregate.

Second round

|}

First leg

Second leg

Olympiacos won 1–0 on aggregate.

Atlético Madrid won 2–0 on aggregate.

Sparta Prague won 4–2 on aggregate.

Parma won 2–0 on aggregate.

Feyenoord won 4–2 on aggregate.

Spartak Moscow won 6–2 on aggregate.

Royal Antwerp won 7–6 on aggregate.

4–4 on aggregate; Steaua București won on away goals.

Quarter-finals

|}

First leg

Second leg

Atlético Madrid won 4–2 on aggregate.

Spartak Moscow won 4–1 on aggregate.

Parma won 2–0 on aggregate.

1–1 on aggregate; Royal Antwerp won on away goals.

Semi-finals

|}

First leg

Second leg

Royal Antwerp won 3–2 on aggregate.

2–2 on aggregate; Parma won on away goals.

Final

Top scorers
The top scorers from the 1992–93 UEFA Cup Winners' Cup are as follows:

See also
1992–93 UEFA Champions League
1992–93 UEFA Cup

External links
1992–93 competition at UEFA website
Cup Winners' Cup results at Rec.Sport.Soccer Statistics Foundation

3
UEFA Cup Winners' Cup seasons